The 1996 Kansas State Wildcats football team represented Kansas State University in the 1996 NCAA Division I-A football season.  The team's head football coach was Bill Snyder.  The Wildcats played their home games in KSU Stadium.  1996 saw the Wildcats finish with a record of 9–3, and a 6–2 record in Big 12 Conference play.

The season ended with a loss against fifth-ranked BYU in the 1997 Cotton Bowl Classic—the school's first appearance in a traditional New Year's Day bowl game.  1996 was also the first year of competition for the Big 12 Conference, and Kansas State's home game against Texas Tech was the first athletic event in Big 12 history.

Schedule

Roster

Rankings

References

Kansas State
Kansas State Wildcats football seasons
Kansas State Wildcats footbal